

Events

Births
 Peter III of Aragon (died 1285), an Occitan troubadour and King of Eragon

Deaths
 March 28 - Emperor Go-Toba (born 1180), Japanese Emperor, calligrapher, painter, musician, poet, critic, and editor

13th-century poetry
Poetry